MV Macdhui was a steel-hulled passenger and cargo motor ship built by Barclay Curle & Company at the Clydeholm Yard, Whiteinch, Scotland for Burns, Philp & Company, Limited, Sydney NSW, Australia. She was launched on 23 December 1930 and completed during March 1931. She operated with the company's Burns, Philp Line with service to Papua and New Guinea. She was sunk in 1942, as a result of damage suffered by being hit by bombs from Japanese aircraft, near Port Moresby.

History
Her code letters were LGVM until 1933–34, when they were superseded by the call sign VJNC. Macdhui crossed the Atlantic and after a rough voyage transited the Panama Canal, acquiring a ship's cat for luck at Balboa, on the delivery voyage to Australia.

On 20 June 1937, a serious fire broke out in the ship's engine room in the early hours of the morning, putting her in danger. Passengers were ordered into the boats. By four in the morning the engine room fire was out, but damage was severe and the engines were disabled. The European passengers were taken back aboard with some 150 islanders as deck passengers, and were then put ashore at Fortification Point. A second, minor fire broke out in the number four hold, and was quickly put out. Responding to the distress call Neptuna, another of the company's ships, reached Macdhui the next day to tow the disabled ship to port.

In December 1941 with Japanese threatening islands to the north the Australian government decided to begin evacuating women and children from New Guinea, Papua, and Darwin. After Japanese landing on Rabaul some of the troops evacuated to Port Moresby were transported to Townsville aboard Macdhui in late April 1942.

After the initial bombing on 19 February 1942, Japanese air raids continued on Darwin during June, with a sixteenth raid on 13 June. Raids continued each night through to the 17 June, when Port Moresby had its 61st raid. Macdhui was hit, first amidships, then gutted, with three crew and one military working party member killed. The next day she was again hit and became a total loss.

In 2019, her hull was still visible off the village of Hanuabada.

References

Bibliography

External links
Postcard showing ship, line & services (Australian National Maritime Museum)
Burns Philip Line — Macdhui Picnic Races 3 December 1938 (Australian National Maritime Museum)
Burns Philp ship, the "M.V. Macdhui" of Sydney moored to a jetty, Rabaul, New Guinea, 1937
Port Moresby Harbour, 1942-06-18 Macdhui — distant shot showing harbor with ship burning (Australian War Memorial)
Port Moresby Harbour, 1942-06-18. The Motor Vessel Macdhui On Fire (Australian War Memorial)
Film, Raid on Port Moresby, Macdhui burning (Australian War Memorial)
Painting: The bombing of the Macdhui (Australian War Memorial)
Pacific Wrecks – MV Macdhui
Pacific Wrecks – HMAS Macdhui
Wreck Photo
Dive Site website
The Mast of the Macdhui (Royal Papua Yacht Club's signal mast)

1930 ships
Maritime incidents in 1937
Maritime incidents in 1942
Passenger ships of Australia
Ships built on the River Clyde
Ships sunk by Japanese aircraft
Shipwrecks of Papua New Guinea
World War II merchant ships of Australia